"Walla Zaman Ya Selahy" was the national anthem of the United Arab Republic (UAR), a federation of Egypt and Syria, from 1960. Though the UAR disbanded in 1961, Egypt retained it as the official name of the state until 1971, and used its national anthem until 1979.

History

Prior to being adopted as the UAR's national anthem, it was used as a nationalist song performed by Umm Kulthum during the Suez Crisis in 1956, known in Egypt and the Arab world as the Tripartite Aggression, when Egypt was invaded by the United Kingdom, France, and Israel. Due to its strongly nationalist lyrics evoking national resistance, the song was played frequently on Egyptian radio during the war, sometimes as often as every 10 minutes.

The popularity of the song led to it being adopted as the national anthem of the UAR two years after the establishment of the union. It replaced the former official royal anthem of Egypt "Salam Affandina"(Salute of our lord, سلام افندينا, composed by Giuseppe Pugioli) and the unofficial anthem "Nashid al-Huriyya" (The Anthem of Freedom, نشيد الحرية, composed and sung by Mohammed Abdel Wahab), which were adopted following the Egyptian revolution of 1952 and the abolition of the monarchy, as well as the former national anthem of Syria.

The lyrics were written by Salah Jahin, with music by Kamal Al Taweel. It was also used, without words, by Iraq from 1965 to 1981.

It was eventually replaced in 1979 for the peace negotiations with Israel by President Anwar Sadat as Egypt's national anthem by the less militant "Bilady, Bilady, Bilady", which continues to be Egypt's national anthem today.

Lyrics

References

External links 
 Information, Audio, Lyrics, and Sheet Music on Walla Zaman Ya Selahy

Anthems of Egypt
Historical national anthems
United Arab Republic
African anthems
Asian anthems
1960 songs
Umm Kulthum songs